Germany participated at the 2017 Summer Universiade, in Taipei, Taiwan.

Medal summary

Medal by sports

References

 Germany Overview

External links
Universiade Taipei 2017 

Nations at the 2017 Summer Universiade
Germany at the Summer Universiade
2017 in German sport